Incomplete list of fraternities or Studentenverbindungen in Switzerland, listed with foundation date and home university.
Most of these societies are members of a Federation of societies such as the Schweizerischer Studentenverein (Schw. StV)/Société des Étudiants Suisses (SES) or have subsections at more than one university as the Zofingerverein does.

 GV Agaunia, 1859, Collège de la Royale Abbaye de Saint-Maurice
 AKV Alemannia, 1895, Fribourg
 Société de Belles Lettres in Lausanne, Geneva, Neuchatel and Bruxelles (Belgium) it's the first Student Society created in Switzerland 
 AV Berchtoldia, Berne
 K.St.V. Carolingia-Fribourg, 1929, Fribourg
 GV Corvina Einsiedeln, 1848, Stiftsschule Einsiedeln
 AV Fryburgia, 1918, University of Fribourg
 AV Goten, 1953, Fribourg
 Société d’Étudiants Germania Lausanne, 1887, Lausanne
 Schweizerische Studentenverbindung Helvetia, 1832, founded in Lucerne, today with sections in  Basel, Berne, Geneva, Lausanne and Zürich
 AV Kybelia, 1999, St. Gallen 
 AKV Kyburger, 1912, Zürich
 AV Leonina, 1896, Fribourg
 AKV Neu-Romania, 1938 (split off Alemannia), Fribourg
 AV Notkeriana, 1990, St. Gallen
 AV Orion, 1964, Zürich
 AKV Rauracia, 1863, Basel
 CA Rezia, 1957, Fribourg
 SA Sarinia, 1895, Fribourg
 AV Semper Fidelis Luzern, 1843, Lucerne
 AV Staufer, 1937, Fribourg
 AV Steinacher, 1953, St. Gallen
 Studentengesangverein Zürich ("Zürcher Singstudenten), 1849, Zurich
 Corps Tigurinia Zürich, 1850, Zürich
 AV Turicia, 1860
Valdesia in Lausanne 
 AV Waldstättia, 1891, Lucerne
 Schweizerischer Zofingerverein, 1819, eight universities, the oldest fraternity in Switzerland.
 Wengia Solodorensis, 1884, Solothurn
Zofingue 

The societies are traditionally categorized by their stance towards academic fencing. There are four categories, 
pflichtschlagend (fencing bouts are obligatory), fakultativ schlagend (training sessions in fencing are obligatory, but not participation in actual fencing bouts), frei schlagend (both fencing practice and duels are allowed but not required of members) and nichtschlagend (no fencing).
Those Swiss societies which practice fencing are united in the Schweizerischer Waffenring. Some examples of "pflichtschlagenden Studentenverbindungen" in Switzerland today are AT Alemannia (Basel), AT Utonia (Zürich) or AT Rhenania (Bern). Schweizerische Studentenverbindung Helvetia is unique in that its German-speaking sections practice fencing while its French-speaking ones do not.
The Schweizerischer Studentenverein decided during the second half of the 19th century to forbid fencing to its members due to reasons of religion. Duelling was and still is seen as contrary to Christian/catholic values on which this Federation is based.

Further reading 
 Schweizerischer Studentenverein
 Studentenverbindung

References

External links